Mary Elizabeth Anderson Pawlenty (born January 13, 1961) is a former American state court judge who served on Minnesota's First Judicial District from 1994 to 2007. The wife of Governor Tim Pawlenty, she was First Lady of Minnesota from 2003 to 2011. She previously worked as a private-practice attorney and in 2009 became director at a medical nonprofit. She has been a mediator with Gilbert Mediation since 2007.

Early life and education
Mary Anderson was raised in Edina, Minnesota. In 1979, she graduated from Edina-East High School. In 1983, she graduated from Bethel University, earning a bachelor's degree in political science, summa cum laude. She received her Juris Doctor, cum laude, from the University of Minnesota Law School—where she met Tim Pawlenty—in 1986.

Legal career
Following graduation, Anderson practiced law in Houston, Texas for one year. She then returned to Minnesota to marry Tim Pawlenty. They settled in Eagan, Minnesota.

In 1994, Mary was appointed as a Judge of the District Court of Minnesota for Dakota County in Hastings, Minnesota by Governor Arne Carlson. She and her husband began raising their two daughters, Anna (born 1993) and Mara.

First Lady of Minnesota
The family remained at their Eagan home instead of taking the Governor's Residence after Tim Pawlenty was elected Governor of Minnesota in 2002 due to Mary's requirement to stay in her judicial district.

As First Lady of Minnesota, Mary Pawlenty established a web-based program that facilitated the connection between community-based organizations willing to volunteer their time and services and the families of deployed servicemen and women - an initiative that is continued by the Minnesota National Guard as a nationally recognized model for web-based and community support for military families, known as Beyond the Yellow Ribbon.

Leaving the judicial bench
In January 2007, after her husband was sworn into his second term as governor, Judge Pawlenty announced that she was leaving the bench on February 12, 2007. She began work at the National Arbitration Forum shortly thereafter as its general counsel in charge of the National Arbitration Forum's legal affairs. However, she quit her position with National Arbitration Forum and in September, 2007 Pawlenty  became a mediator with the Gilbert Mediation Center, where she assists parties in settling disputes, both before and during civil litigation. From January 2009 to January 2010, she was the director of medical diplomacy at Children's HeartLink, an international medical nonprofit organisation.

References

External links
 Mary Pawlenty biography and photos
The Sacrifices of Mary Pawlenty in The Atlantic

1961 births
Living people
People from Edina, Minnesota
Bethel University (Minnesota) alumni
University of Minnesota Law School alumni
Texas lawyers
People from Eagan, Minnesota
Minnesota lawyers
Women in Minnesota politics
First Ladies and Gentlemen of Minnesota
American women judges
Minnesota state court judges
People from Hastings, Minnesota
Dispute resolution
Minnesota Republicans
Edina High School alumni